Ludovico Gelmi (born 2 May 2001) is an Italian professional footballer who plays as a goalkeeper for  club Olbia, on loan from Atalanta.

Club career
Born in Alzano Lombardo, in 2011 Gelmi joined to Atalanta youth system.

On 7 July 2021, he joined to Serie C club Feralpisalò on loan. Made his debut in Serie C on 28 August against Fiorenzuola.

On 31 January 2022, Gelmi moved on a new loan to Pro Vercelli. 

On 14 July 2022, he joined Olbia on loan.

International career
Gelmi is a former youth international for Italy.

References

External links 
 

2001 births
Living people
People from Alzano Lombardo
Sportspeople from the Province of Bergamo
Italian footballers
Association football goalkeepers
Serie C players
Atalanta B.C. players
FeralpiSalò players
F.C. Pro Vercelli 1892 players
Olbia Calcio 1905 players
Italy youth international footballers
Footballers from Lombardy